The 2017 British Academy Children's Awards was held on November 26, 2017, at The Roundhouse in London, honoring children's television programmes broadcast between October 2016 and October 2017. The ceremony was hosted by Doc Brown; CBBC had the most nominations.

Awards
Winners are listed first, highlighted in boldface, and indicated with a double dagger.

Animation

Channel

Comedy

Drama

Entertainment

Factual

Feature Film

Game

Independent Production Company

Interactive

International

Learning

Performer

Pre-School - Animation

Pre-School - Live-Action

Presenter

Short Form

Writer

References

2017
Children's television awards
British children's entertainment
November 2017 events in the United Kingdom